Big Four or Big 4 may refer to:

Groups of companies 
 Big Four accounting firms: Deloitte, Ernst & Young, KPMG, PwC
 Big Four (airlines) in the U.S. in the 20th century: American, Eastern, TWA, United
 Big Four (banking), several groupings of banks in different countries
 Big Four (British railway companies) in the period 1923–1947: GWR, LMS, LNER, SR
 Big Four (radio networks) in the U.S.: CBS, NBC, ABC, Mutual
 Big Four Railroad, a nickname of the Cleveland, Cincinnati, Chicago and St. Louis Railway in the U.S.
 Big Four American tech companies: Apple, Amazon, Google, Meta Platforms
 Big Four television networks in the U.S.: CBS, NBC, ABC, Fox
 The "Big Four" largest UK ITV companies 1955–1968: 
 Big Four state-owned car manufacturers of China, namely: SAIC Motor, FAW Group, Dongfeng Motor Corporation, and Changan Automobile
 Japanese Big Four motorcycle manufacturers: Honda, Kawasaki, Suzuki, Yamaha
 Big Four supermarkets chains in the United Kingdom: Tesco, Sainsbury's, Asda, and Morrisons

Groups of people 
 Big Four (Central Pacific Railroad), 19th century American railroad entrepreneurs
 Big Four (debutantes), in the Chicago social scene during World War I
 Big Four (Najaf), leading Grand Ayatollahs of Twelver Shia Islam
 The Four Companions, the most loyal companions of Muhammad and Ali.
 Big Four (Scotland Yard), London detectives of about 1919
 Big Four of Maryland Thoroughbred racing, horse trainers in the 1960s–1970s
 The Big Four (Calgary), Alberta cattlemen of the early 20th century
 The Four Greats (Norwegian writers): Ibsen, Bjørnson, Lie, Kielland

Groups in sport 
 Big Four (Canadian football), a forerunner competition to the Canadian Football League East Division
 Big Four (English football) in the 2000s: Arsenal, Chelsea, Liverpool, Manchester United
 Big Four in Formula 1: McLaren, Williams, Renault (formerly Benetton), and Ferrari, from 1980s to 2008
 Big Four (Mexico), a group of the top four football clubs in Mexico: Club América, Chivas, Cruz Azul and Pumas
 Big Four (polo), an American polo team of the early 20th century
 Big Four (tennis), from 2008 to 2017: Federer, Nadal, Djokovic, Murray
 Big Four, the leading major professional sports leagues in the United States and Canada: MLB, NBA, NFL, NHL
 Big-4 League, a senior ice hockey league in Canada between 1919 and 1921

Other groups 
 Big Four (Western Europe): France, Germany, Italy, and the United Kingdom
 Big Four Conference, various conferences between the victorious nations after World War I and World War II
 Big Four (World War I), the four major Allied powers: United States, United Kingdom, France, Italy
 Big Four (World War II), or Four Policemen: United States, United Kingdom, China, Soviet Union
 Big Four outlaw motorcycle clubs: Hells Angels, Pagans, Outlaws, Bandidos
 Big Four international beauty pageants: Miss Earth, Miss International, Miss Universe, and Miss World

Arts, entertainment and media 
 Big Four (band), a Hong Kong music group
 Big Four (Eurovision), the four main sponsoring countries before 2011
 Big Four (Grammy Awards) or the General Field, four standard awards 
 The Big Four (fashion), the 4 most notable Vogue covers: American Vogue, British Vogue, Vogue Paris and Vogue Italia
Big Four of Fashion week: Paris, Milan, London and New York
 Big Four of Britpop: Blur, Oasis, Pulp, Suede
 Big Four of Doom metal: Candlemass, Pentagram, Saint Vitus, Trouble
 Big Four of Grunge: Nirvana, Pearl Jam, Soundgarden, Alice in Chains
 Big Four of Power metal: Helloween, Blind Guardian, Sabaton, DragonForce
 Big Four of Thrash metal: Anthrax, Megadeth, Metallica, Slayer
 The Big Four: Live from Sofia, Bulgaria a 2010 concert recording
 Big Four, a key rhythmic innovation on the marching band beat, invented by Buddy Bolden
 Big 4 (sculpture), outside the Channel 4 headquarters in London
 Big Four films of the Disney Renaissance: The Little Mermaid, Beauty and The Beast, Aladdin and The Lion King
 Marvel Comics' Big Four Avengers: Iron Man, Captain America, Thor and Hulk
 The Big Four (novel), by Agatha Christie, 1927

Places 
 Big Four, West Virginia, U.S.
 Big Four Bridge, connecting Louisville, Kentucky, and Jeffersonville, Indiana, U.S.
 Big Four Mountain, Washington, U.S.

Other uses 
 Big 4 (lottery), a game in the Pennsylvania Lottery
 Big Four (Indian snakes), four snake species responsible for the most snake-bites in India
 Big Four (White Star Line), four British ocean liners of the early 20th century
 Norton Big 4, a British motorcycle 1907–1954
 After World War I: The major allied powers (United States, United Kingdom, France, and Italy), who held separate sessions during the peace negotiations.
 After World War II: The major allied powers United States, Soviet Union, United Kingdom, and China (later France).
 The main Nazi war criminals Adolf Hitler, Heinrich Himmler, Joseph Goebbels, and Hermann Göring.

See also 

 Big One (disambiguation)
 Big Two (disambiguation)
 Big Three (disambiguation)
 Big Five (disambiguation)
 Big Six (disambiguation)
 Big Seven (disambiguation)
 Big Eight (disambiguation)
 Big Ten (disambiguation)
 Big 12
 Core Four
 Fab Four
 Quadruple Alliance (disambiguation)